Jabal al-Druze, officially Jabal al-Arab, is an elevated volcanic region in the As-Suwayda Governorate of southern Syria. Most of the inhabitants of this region are Druze, and there are also small Muslim and significant Christian communities. Safaitic inscriptions were first found in this area. The State of Jabal Druze was an autonomous area in the French Mandate for Syria and the Lebanon from 1921 to 1936. In the past, the name Jabal al-Druze was used for a different area, located in Mount Lebanon.

Geology

The Jabal al-Druze volcanic field, the southernmost in Syria, lies in the Haurun-Druze Plateau in SW Syria near the border with Jordan. The most prominent feature of this volcanic field is 1800m-high Jabal al-Druze (also known variously as Jabal ad Duruz, Djebel Al-Arab, Jabal Druze, Djebel ed Drouz). The alkaline volcanic field consists of a group of 118 basaltic volcanoes active from the lower-Pleistocene to the Holocene (2.6 million years ago to present). The large SW Plateau depression is filled by basaltic lava flows from volcanoes aligned in a NW-SE direction. This volcanic field lies within the northern part of the massive alkaline Harrat al-Sham (also known as Harrat al-Shaam) volcanic field that extends from southern Syria to Saudi Arabia.

Peaks

 Tell Qeni (1,803 m)
 Tell Joualine (1,732 m)
 Tell Sleiman (1,703 m)
 Tell Qleib (1,698 m)
 Tell Abou-Hamra (1,482 m)
 Tell El-Ahmar (1,452 m)
 Tell Abed-Mar (1,436 m)
 Tell Khodr-Imtan (1,341 m)
 Tell Azran (1,220 m)
 Tell Shihan (1,138 m)

In Arabic, the word "tell" means "mound" or "hill", but in Jabal al-Druze it rather refers to a volcanic cone.

See also
Druze in Syria
Jabal Druze State
List of volcanoes in Syria

References

Jabal ad Duruz
Volcanic fields
Druze in Syria
Druze
Cultural regions
Eastern Mediterranean conifer–sclerophyllous–broadleaf forests